Cynthia Plaster Caster (born Cynthia Dorothy Albritton; May 24, 1947 – April 21, 2022) was an American visual artist and self-described "recovering groupie" who gained fame for creating plaster casts of celebrities' erect penises.

Albritton began her career in 1968 by casting penises of rock musicians. She later expanded her subjects to include filmmakers and other types of artists, eventually amassing a collection of 50 plaster phalluses. In 2000, she added casting female artists' breasts.

Biography
Cynthia Dorothy Albritton was born in Chicago. Shy as a young girl, Albritton sought out a way to make contact with the opposite sex. In the late 1960s, she became caught up in free love and rock music. Albritton studied at the University of Illinois Chicago. In college, when her art teacher gave the class an assignment to "plaster cast something solid that could retain its shape", she hit upon the idea of casting erect male genitalia, which would then go flaccid and exit the mold. Finding a dental mold-making substance called alginate to be sufficient, she found her first celebrity client in Jimi Hendrix, the first of many to submit to the idea.

Meeting Frank Zappa, who found the concept of "casting" both humorous and creative as an art form (though he himself had no interest in submitting to the procedure), Albritton found in him something of a patron. He moved her to Los Angeles, which she described as a veritable groupie heaven, with no lack of willing assistants eager to prepare the subjects for casting. In 1971, after her apartment was burgled, Zappa and Albritton decided the casts should be preserved for a future exhibition, entrusting them to Zappa's legal partner, Herb Cohen, for safekeeping. The exhibition idea did not take off however due to a sudden lack of rock stars willing to participate. She made no casts between 1971 and 1980. After years of wrangling, Albritton found herself in 1993 having to go to court in order to retrieve the 25 casts Cohen held (she got all but three of them back). In 2000, Albritton finally held her first exhibition of the casts in New York City. She also decided to begin casting women's breasts as an egalitarian move.

In 2001, a film documentary, Plaster Caster, was made about her. She also contributed to the BBC Three documentary My Penis and I (2005), made by British filmmaker Lawrence Barraclough about his anxiety over his 9 cm (-inch) erect penis. She has inspired at least two songs: "Five Short Minutes" by Jim Croce and "Plaster Caster" by Kiss. She is also mentioned in Momus' song "The Penis Song" on his album Folktronic and the Le Tigre song "Nanny Nanny Boo Boo". In 1969, Pamela Des Barres, of Frank Zappa's group The GTOs, recorded a telephone conversation with Cynthia from Chicago for the GTOs album Permanent Damage.

Albritton was a candidate for mayor of Chicago in the 2011 election on the "Hard Party" ticket.

She is the inspiration for the character 'Juicy Lucy' in Good Girls Revolt, whom Patty interviews as a witness to the Altamont riot.

Albritton died from cerebrovascular disease at a care facility in Chicago on April 21, 2022, aged 74. 

Shortly before her death, Albritton donated her 1968 plaster cast of Jimi Hendrix's erect penis to the Icelandic Phallological Museum.

List of casts
Source:

Men

0002 Joel Coplon (February 16, 1968), friend
0003 Al Hernandez (February 18, 1968), friend
0004 Jimi Hendrix (February 25, 1968), guitarist - The Jimi Hendrix Experience
0005 Noel Redding (March 30, 1968), bass player - The Jimi Hendrix Experience
0006 Don Ogilvie (May 5, 1968), road manager - Mandala (band)
0007 Bob Pridden (August 1, 1968), road manager and engineer - The Who
0008 Eric Burdon (September 3, 1969), singer - The Animals (mold failure, no cast)
0009 Richard Cole (November 26, 1968), tour manager - Led Zeppelin
0010 Dennis Thompson (February 26, 1969), drummer - MC5
0011 Wayne Kramer (February 26, 1969), guitarist - MC5
0012 Frank Cook (March 31, 1969), drummer - Pacific Gas & Electric (band)
0013 Fritz Richmond (May 12, 1969), washtub bass player - Jim Kweskin Jug Band
0014 Michael Vestey (May 30, 1969), record producer
0015 Bob Grant (June 5, 1969), conservative radio host
0016 Anthony Newley (June 7, 1969), singer/songwriter
0017 Danay West (June 11, 1969), manager - Iron Butterfly (never returned by Cohen)
0018 Eddie Brigati (June 23, 1969), singer - The Rascals
0019 Barry Bono (June 23, 1969), road manager - The Rascals (never returned by Cohen)
0020 Harvey Mandel (July 10, 1969), guitarist
0021 Lee Mallory (July 22, 1969), singer/songwriter
0022 Doug Dillard (July 27, 1969), banjo player - The Dillards (mold failure, no cast)
0023 John Barr (July 30, 1969), bass player - The Churls
0024 Tony Stevens (September 7, 1969), bass player - Foghat, Savoy Brown (never returned by Cohen)
0025 Keef Hartley (September 8, 1969), drummer - Keef Hartley Band, others (mold failure, no cast)
0026 Keith Webb (September 9, 1969), drummer - Terry Reid
0027 Bob Henrit (April 30, 1970), drummer - Argent (band), The Kinks
0028 Zal Yanovsky (July 14, 1970), singer/guitarist - The Lovin' Spoonful
0032 Aynsley Dunbar (September 30, 1970), drummer - The Mothers of Invention, Journey (band), others
0033 Ricky Fataar (October 28, 1971), drummer - Beach Boys, Bonnie Raitt, The Rutles
0034 Smutty Smiff (Steven Douglas Smith) (October 12, 1980), bass player - Levi and the Rockats (mold failure, no cast)
0035 John Smothers (November 29, 1980), bodyguard - Frank Zappa
0036 Ivan Karamazov (Howard Jay Patterson) (June 11, 1981), juggler - The Flying Karamazov Brothers
0037 Shane Eason (January 22, 82), drummer - Loverboy
0038 Mary Byker (Ian Garfield Hoxley) (April 16, 1988), singer - Gaye Bykers on Acid
0039 Jon Langford (June 29, 1988), singer/guitarist - The Mekons, The Three Johns
0040 Chris Connelly (September 8, 1988), singer - Revolting Cocks, Ministry (band)
0043 Clint Poppie (Clint Mansell) (September 30, 1989) singer - Pop Will Eat Itself
0044 Terryll Loffler (June 30, 1990), filmmaker
0045 Brian St. Clair (February 19, 1991), drummer - Rights of the Accused, Triple Fast Action, Local H
0047 Jello Biafra (Eric Reed Boucher) (April 29, 1991), singer - Dead Kennedys
0048 Pete Shelley (Peter McNeish) (November 10, 1991), singer/songwriter/guitarist - Buzzcocks (mold failure, no cast)
0049 Bart Flores (August 8, 1993), drummer - Wreck (band), Pigface
0050 Ronnie Barnett (August 9, 1993) bass player - The Muffs
0051 Richard Lloyd (May 11, 1994), guitarist - Television (band), Matthew Sweet
0052 Mike Diana (March 3, 1995), cartoonist 
0054 Martin Atkins (February 21, 1996), drummer - Public Image Limited, Killing Joke, Pigface, Ministry (band), Nine Inch Nails
0057 Russ Forster (September 29, 1997), filmmaker, fanzine writer, label owner Underdog Records, multi-instrumentalist with Spongetunnel, engineer for Screeching Weasel
0060 Momus (Nick Currie) (February 14, 1998), singer/songwriter
0062 Jake Shillingford (December 18, 1999), singer - My Life Story
0065 Danny Doll Rod (Dan Kroha) (March 15, 2000), guitarist - Demolition Doll Rods
0067 Billy Dolan (April 2, 2000), guitarist - Five Style
0069 David Yow (August 6, 2000), actor, singer/bassist - The Jesus Lizard, Scratch Acid
0071 Bobby Conn (Jeffrey Stafford) (January 18, 2001), singer/songwriter/guitarist
0073 Lawrence Barraclough (September 26, 2004), filmmaker (of My Penis and I)
0074 Lawrence Barraclough (September 26, 2004), filmmaker 
0075 Ariel Pink (Ariel Marcus Rosenberg) (February 19, 2006), singer/songwriter
0077 Lias Kaci Saoudi (March 20, 2014), singer - Fat White Family

Women

00001 Suzi Gardner (May 28, 2000), singer/guitarist - L7
00002 Suzi Gardner (May 28, 2000), singer/guitarist - L7
00003 Christine Doll Rod (Christine Gomoll) (August 26, 2000), drummer - Demolition Doll Rods
00004 Christine Doll Rod (Christine Gomoll) (August 26, 2000), drummer - Demolition Doll Rods
00005 Margaret Doll Rod (Margaret Gomoll) (August 26, 2000), singer/guitarist - Demolition Doll Rods
00006 Margaret Doll Rod (Margaret Gomoll) (August 26, 2000), singer/guitarist - Demolition Doll Rods
00007 Monica BouBou (January 18, 2001), singer/violinist - Bobby Conn
00008 Monica BouBou (January 18, 2001), singer/violinist - Bobby Conn
00009 Lætitia Sadier (January 28, 2001), singer/keyboardist - Stereolab
00010 Lætitia Sadier (January 28, 2001), singer/keyboardist - Stereolab
00011 Peaches (Merrill Beth Nisker) (May 9, 2001), singer
00012 Peaches (Merrill Beth Nisker) (May 9, 2001), singer
00013 Sally Timms (May 30, 2001), singer - The Mekons
00014 Sally Timms (May 30, 2001), singer - The Mekons
00023 Stephanie Barber (February 9, 2002), artist
00024 Stephanie Barber (February 9, 2002), artist
00027 Karen O (Karen Lee Orzolek) (May 1, 2003), singer - Yeah Yeah Yeahs
00028 Karen O (Karen Lee Orzolek) (May 1, 2003), singer - Yeah Yeah Yeahs
00029 Cynthia Plaster Caster (self) (May 26, 2013), artist
00030 Cynthia Plaster Caster (self) (May 26, 2013), artist
00031 Cynthia Plaster Caster (self) (May 26, 2013), artist
00032 Cynthia Plaster Caster (self) (May 26, 2013), artist 
00033 Jan Terri (December 15, 2013), singer/songwriter
00034 Jan Terri (December 15, 2013), singer/songwriter

References

External links 
 
 

1947 births
2022 deaths
20th-century American women artists
21st-century American women artists
Artists from Chicago
Candidates in the 2011 United States elections
Neurological disease deaths in Illinois
Deaths from cerebrovascular disease
Groupies
Pigface members
University of Illinois Chicago alumni